The simple-station Tercer Milenio is part of the TransMilenio mass-transit system of Bogotá, Colombia, opened in the year 2000.

Location 
The station is located in the center of the city, more specifically on  Caracas Avenue between Avenida de los Comuneros and Diagonal 7 Bis.

It meets the demand of the neighborhoods La Estanzuela, Santa Inés, San Bernardo, Eduardo Santos and its surroundings.

In the vicinity are:
 The main headquarters of the Policía Metropolitana de Bogotá
 The Parque Tercer Milenio
 The Instituto Nacional de Medicina Legal y Ciencias Forenses.

Etymology 
The station receives its name from Parque Tercer Milenio, located on the eastern side. This park is recognized for being the largest park in the downtown area of Bogotá as well as for renovating an area previously depressed, known as El Cartucho.

Station services

Old trunk services

Main line service

Feeder routes
This station does not have connections to feeder routes.

Inter-city service
This station does not have inter-city service.

See also
 Bogotá
 TransMilenio
 List of TransMilenio Stations

External links
 TransMilenio
 suRumbo.com

TransMilenio
2001 establishments in Colombia